Cotati was a steam cargo ship built in 1918–1919 by Moore Shipbuilding and Drydock Company of Oakland for the United States Shipping Board (USSB) as part of the wartime shipbuilding program of the Emergency Fleet Corporation (EFC) to restore the nation's Merchant Marine. The vessel was briefly used for the first two years of her career to transport frozen meat between North and South America and Europe. The ship was subsequently laid up at the end of 1921 and remained part of the Reserve Fleet through the end of 1940. In January 1941 she was sold together with two other vessels to the New Zealand Shipping Co. and subsequently in 1942 was transferred to the Ministry of War Transport (MoWT) and renamed Empire Avocet.

Design and construction
After the United States entry into World War I, a large shipbuilding program was undertaken to restore and enhance shipping capabilities both of the United States and their Allies. As part of this program, EFC placed orders with nation's shipyards for a large number of vessels of standard designs. Design 1015 cargo ship was a standard cargo freighter of approximately 9,400 tons deadweight designed by Moore Shipbuilding Co. and adopted by USSB.

Cotati was part of the second order for 10 additional vessels placed by USSB with Moore Shipbuilding Co. on 31 December 1917. Cotati was the fifth of these vessels and was laid down at the shipbuilder's yard on 12 October 1918, and launched on 30 March 1919 (yard number 133), with Mrs. Georgie Page (née Hammond), wife of George T. Page, owner of the Rancho Cotati, being the sponsor. The vessel was named after the Cotati ranch.

The ship was shelter-deck type, had two main decks and was built on the Isherwood principle of longitudinal framing providing extra strength to the body of the vessel. The freighter had four main holds and also possessed all the modern machinery for quick loading and unloading of cargo from five large hatches, including ten winches and a large number of derricks. She was also equipped with wireless apparatus, had submarine signal system installed and had electrical lights installed along the decks. In addition, Cotati was equipped with carbonic anhydride refrigerating system built by York Manufacturing Co., which was capable of providing  of refrigerated space in eight chambers.

The steam for the engine was supplied by three Scotch marine boilers fitted for oil fuel.

After successful completion of sea trials, the vessel was transferred to her owners on 26 August 1919 and immediately commissioned into service.

Operational history
As the ship was nearing her completion, she was assigned to McCormick & McPherson for one trip to carry flour to the East Coast of the United States or Europe. Following an established USSB policy the Shipping Board ship could only continue with cargo to Europe if an equivalent amount of cargo space would be allocated by a foreign shipping operator, so Cotati were to discharge her cargo in one of the East Coast ports. After acceptance, the vessel loaded 7,800 tons of flour in San Francisco and departed on 5 September 1919 bound for Norfolk and New York. Cotati passed through the Panama Canal on September 21 and reached her destination on September 30, successfully completing her maiden voyage. The ship remained idle in New York until early December when she was chartered for one trip to carry food supplies to Germany. Cotati proceeded to load over 4,000 tons of fresh beef and pork in Boston before sailing out on New Year's Day 1920 bound for Rotterdam and Hamburg. The vessel reached Rotterdam on January 15, and returned to Wilmington on March 17 to unload her part cargo of kainite. Cotati then was assigned to International Freighting Corporation and sailed to Philadelphia for loading a week later. The freighter cleared out from Philadelphia on her first trip under new management on April 21  carrying general merchandise to South American ports of Buenos Aires, Rio de Janeiro and Montevideo. On her return trip she became disabled while northwest of Bermuda and had to be taken into tow by tug Butterfield who safely brought her into New York on 24 September 1920.

Cotati departed Philadelphia on her next trip to South America on December 15. On December 18 she picked up a distress call from Boston-based schooner Jane Palmer on her voyage from Newport News to Buenos Aires with a cargo of bituminous coal. Cotati stood by during the night as it was impossible to come close in due to raging storm. As the pumps could not cope with rising waters, the crew hastily abandoned the sinking schooner in one lifeboat and started rowing towards the steamer. As they reached Cotati, their lifeboat capsized but the entire crew was saved and taken aboard of Cotati. The freighter then proceeded towards Bermuda where they landed the schooner's crew on December 20.

The freighter then continued on to Brazil and Argentina, arriving at Rio de Janeiro on 6 January 1921. After unloading the cargo, the vessel loaded frozen beef and sailed for London reaching it on March 13. Cotati then returned to South America one more time in April loading another full cargo of frozen beef and departed Buenos Aires for London on May 26. After unloading her cargo, the ship departed from England at the end of July and arrived at Philadelphia in ballast on 11 August 1921. Upon return, Cotati was returned to the Shipping Board and subsequently was laid up in James River, becoming a part of the Reserve Fleet.

Following the dissolution of the Shipping Board under the Merchant Marine Act of 1936, Cotati was transferred to the United States Maritime Commission and remained part of the reserve fleet. In August 1937 it was reported that Maritime Commission ordered 38 ships laid up at Fort Eustis, including Cotati,  to be repainted and inspected. The vessels returned to their anchorage following the completion of work. In December 1940 the Maritime Commission offered 24 laid up vessels for sale to any bidder on "as is, where is" basis. Due to high shipping losses suffered since the beginning of World War II, British shipping companies made a bid for all vessels through their New York City based broker, J. H. Winchester & Company. On 23 January 1941, the Maritime Commission agreed to sell 12 laid up ships, including Cotati, to British interests. As part of the deal, the British paid  for Cotati and additional  for repairs and refurbishing of the freighter. The sale was formally approved by the Maritime Commission in March of the same year, and Cotati together with two other vessels were transferred to the New Zealand Shipping Co. The ship was then moved to the Bethlehem Steel Co. shipyard to undergo repairs and prepare her for service. After completion of repairs and refurbishing, Cotati proceeded to New York and from there sailed out unescorted on 5 October 1941 bound for South America. After loading her usual cargo of frozen meat and other supplies, she departed Buenos Aires on 31 December 1941. While en route the ship was transferred under control of the Ministry of War Transport while still remaining under management of the New Zealand Shipping Co. Cotati arrived at Trinidad on 19 January 1942, and after nearly a three week delay, sailed out for Halifax reaching it February 20.

The freighter remained in port for the next two months, finally being able to sail on April 17 as part of convoy SC-80. The steamer, however, developed problems with her machinery and was forced to turn back. After finalizing the repairs, Cotati left Halifax with convoy SC-82 on April 30, and safely arrived at Liverpool on May 16 after largely an uneventful journey. Upon arrival in England, the vessel was defensively armed and renamed Empire Avocet. The freighter then left Liverpool on July 21 on her first voyage under new name as part of convoy OS-35 with a cargo of chemicals, machinery and general merchandise bound for South America. The ship left the convoy off the coast of Africa and proceeded independently to Montevideo and then to Buenos Aires, safely reaching her destination on August 22. After unloading, Empire Avocet embarked her typical cargo at Buenos Aires and Rio Grande.

Sinking

Empire Avocet departed Rio Grande for her last voyage on 16 September 1942. The vessel was under command of Captain Frederick Pover, had a crew of 51 men in addition to seven Navy gunners. The ship carried her usual cargo consisting of 3,724 tons of frozen meat and 1,225 tons of general merchandise, and was bound for Freetown. Shortly after midnight on 30 September 1942, while in an approximate position , she was spotted by U-125, commanded by Kapitänleutnant Ulrich Folkers. At about 00:35 U-125 fired one torpedo at Empire Avocet hitting her on port side near the funnel. The steamer stopped and started taking on water immediately prompting the captain to order the crew to abandon ship. At approximately 01:16, seeing that the freighter was still afloat, U-125 fired another torpedo, hitting the ship right behind the engine room. The vessel sank deeper but still remained afloat. Approximately 22 minutes later, a third torpedo was fired, delivering coup de grâce. Empire Avocet sank stern first about a minute later. Two crew members were killed in the attack, while the surviving 42 crew members and seven gunners found themselves in two large lifeboats. The submarine then closed in and took the captain and chief engineer aboard for interrogation. Both were taken prisoner.

The two lifeboats started rowing towards the shore, but were separated the next night. On October 7 the second lifeboat, containing the second officer and 22 men made landfall near Bonthe.

Two crew members lost on Empire Avocet are commemorated at the Tower Hill Memorial in London.

Further reading

References

1919 ships
Ships built in Oakland, California
Steamships of the United States
Merchant ships of the United States
Empire ships
Steamships of the United Kingdom
Ministry of War Transport ships
Ships sunk by German submarines in World War II
Maritime incidents in September 1942
World War II shipwrecks in the Atlantic Ocean